The Income Tax Act 2007 (c 3) is an Act of the Parliament of the United Kingdom. It is the primary Act of Parliament concerning income tax paid by individual earners subject to the law of United Kingdom, and mostly replaced the Income and Corporation Taxes Act 1988.

Contents

Part 1 Overview
Part 2 Basic provisions
Part 3 Personal reliefs
Part 4 Loss relief
Part 5 Enterprise investment scheme
Part 6 Venture capital trusts
Part 7 Community investment tax relief
Part 8 Other reliefs
Part 9 Special rules about settlements and trustees
Part 10 Special rules about charitable trusts etc.
Part 11 Manufactured payments and repos
Part 12 Accrued income profits
Part 13 Tax avoidance
Part 14 Income tax liability: miscellaneous rules
Part 15 Deduction of income tax at source
Part 16 Income Tax Acts definitions etc.
Part 17 Definitions for purposes of Act and final provisions

See also
Taxation in the United Kingdom
UK labour law

Notes

References

External links
The Income Tax Act 2007, as amended from the National Archives.
The Income Tax Act 2007, as originally enacted from the National Archives.
Explanatory notes to the Income Tax Act 2007.

United Kingdom Acts of Parliament 2007
Tax legislation in the United Kingdom
Tax codes
Income tax in the United Kingdom
March 2007 events in the United Kingdom
2007 in economics